The Woman's Boat is the third album by American singer/songwriter Toni Childs. Released in 1994, it was Childs' first and only album for the Geffen Records label and would be her last studio album for fourteen years.

The album was not a commercial success and failed to chart in the U.S., although the single "Lay Down Your Pain" reached #13 on the U.S. Billboard Dance/Club Play Chart in January 1995 and also earned Childs a Grammy nomination for Best Female Rock Vocal Performance.

Track listing 
All tracks composed by Toni Childs and Jimmy Smyth; except where indicated
"Womb" (Childs) – 4:49
"Welcome to the World" – 6:15
"Predator" – 6:46
"I Just Want Affection" (Childs) – 5:58
"I Met a Man" (Childs) – 4:44
"The Woman's Boat" (Childs, David Rhodes) – 5:04
"Wild Bride" – 4:02
"Sacrifice" – 5:16
"Lay Down Your Pain" (Childs, David Rhodes) – 6:10
"Long Time Coming" – 4:33
"Death" – 10:27

Personnel 
Toni Childs – vocals, synthesizer
Peter Gabriel – vocals
Sultan Khan – sarangui
Trey Gunn – stick
Ron Aslan – programming, engineer
Caroline Dale – cello
Robert Fripp – guitar
Lee Ann Harris – percussion
Sabine Kabongo – voices
Peter McKinney – drums
David Rhodes – guitar
Carole Rowley – voices
Jimmy Smyth – synthesizer, bass, guitar, piano
Kate St. John – cor anglais
Martin Tillman – cello
Pandit Dinesh – tabla, voices
Eric Flickinger – voices
Ben Findlay – voices
Kirsty Allen – voices
Max Jules Brooks – programming
Ron Reeves – didjerid

Charts

References 

1994 albums
Toni Childs albums
Albums produced by David Bottrill
Geffen Records albums